Kurt Hasse (1916–1999) was a German cinematographer. Having started out as an assistant cameraman during the Nazi era, he was mainly active in postwar West German cinema and later in television.

Selected filmography
 Artists' Blood (1949)
 I'm Waiting for You (1952)
 The Blue and White Lion (1952)
 Beloved Life (1953)
 Such a Charade (1953)
 The Empress of China (1953)
 The Little Town Will Go to Sleep (1954)
 The Mosquito (1954)
 The Man of My Life (1954)
 Dear Miss Doctor (1954)
 Sky Without Stars (1955)
 My Father, the Actor (1956)
 My Ninety Nine Brides (1958)
 I Was All His (1958)
 All the Sins of the Earth (1958)
 As the Sea Rages (1959)
 Crime After School (1959)
 Until Money Departs You (1960)
 Town Without Pity (1961)
 Life Begins at Eight (1962)
 Murder in Rio (1963)
 Situation Hopeless... But Not Serious (1965)
 Holidays in Tyrol (1971)

References

Bibliography 
 Giesen, Rolf.  Nazi Propaganda Films: A History and Filmography. McFarland, 2003.

External links 
 

1916 births
1999 deaths
Mass media people from Königsberg
German cinematographers